Attur block is a revenue block in the Salem district of Tamil Nadu, India. It has a total of 20 panchayat villages.  They are:

 Akkichettipalayam
 Ammampalayam
 Appamasamudram Salem
 Arasanatham
 Chokkanathapuram
 Eachampatty
 Kallanatham
 Kalpaganur
 Koolamedu
 Kothampadi
 Malliakarai
 Manjini
 Paithur
 Pungavadi
 Ramanaickenpalayam
 Seeliampatty
 Thandavarayapuram
 Thennakudipalayam
 Thulukanur
 Valaiyamadevi

References 

Revenue blocks in Salem district